José Isidro Gonçalves Maciel (born 13 February 1989) is a Portuguese cyclist, who currently rides for UCI Continental team . He rode in the 2015 Vuelta a España. His biggest win to date was the overall at the 2016 Tour of Turkey. He was named in the start list for the 2017 Giro d'Italia. In July 2019, he was named in the startlist for the 2019 Tour de France.

Major results

2009
 2nd Time trial, National Under-23 Road Championships
2011
 1st  Time trial, National Under-23 Road Championships
 1st Stage 2 Volta a Coruña
 2nd Volta a Portugal do Futuro
 8th Road race, UEC European Under-23 Road Championships
2012
 1st  Time trial, National Road Championships
 1st Stage 1 GP Efapel
 3rd Overall Troféu Joaquim Agostinho
1st  Young rider classification
 6th Overall Volta ao Alentejo
2013
 1st Polynormande
 1st  Mountains classification Paris–Arras Tour
 3rd Overall Tour of China I
2014
 4th Overall Tour of Hainan
 6th Overall Tour of Qinghai Lake
2015
 1st Stage 5 Volta a Portugal
 4th Overall Boucles de la Mayenne
  Combativity award Stage 2 Vuelta a España
2016
 1st  Overall Presidential Tour of Turkey
 1st Stage 2 GP Beiras e Serra da Estrela
 1st Stage 7 Volta a Portugal
 4th Time trial, National Road Championships
 5th Overall Boucles de la Mayenne
 7th Boucles de l'Aulne
2017
 1st  Overall Ster ZLM Toer
1st Stage 4
 4th Road race, National Road Championships
2018
 2nd Time trial, National Road Championships
2019
 1st  Time trial, National Road Championships
2022
 6th Overall Volta ao Alentejo

Grand Tour general classification results timeline

References

External links

1989 births
Living people
Portuguese male cyclists
People from Barcelos, Portugal
Presidential Cycling Tour of Turkey winners
European Games competitors for Portugal
Cyclists at the 2015 European Games
Sportspeople from Braga District